Steve Pisani (born 7 August 1992) is a Maltese footballer who plays for Gżira United and the Malta national team.

References

Maltese footballers
Maltese Premier League players
1992 births
Living people
Hibernians F.C. players
Floriana F.C. players
Balzan F.C. players
Malta international footballers
Association football wingers